56 Pitt Street is a proposed skyscraper development in Sydney, New South Wales, Australia. Currently in planning phases, if completed, the building would be the first of its kind in Sydney to exceed a height of 300 metres. It was first announced in November 2019. Proposed by property developer and investment company Dexus, it will be located in the northern end of Sydney's CBD and should the project go ahead, it will become the tallest building in Sydney at an estimated height of approximately 314 metres (1020 ft). However, with government incentives, current revised height restrictions and speculative proposals, it has the potential to reach a further height of approximately 330 metres (1083 ft), which could possibly make it the future tallest building in Australia should such proposals proceed.

In mid 2019, Dexus acquired properties on the proposed site of the project for approximately $190 million (AUD)  and has since committed $3.1 billion (AUD) to the project with construction of the project expected to start in 2024. The tower will comprise a floor area of approximately 93,400m²

See also 
 List of tallest buildings in Sydney

References 

Proposed skyscrapers in Australia
Proposed buildings and structures in Sydney